Brian William Johnston (13 June 1933 – 2 June 1998) was a New Zealand field hockey player. He represented New Zealand in field hockey at the 1956 Olympic Games in Melbourne.

References

External links

1933 births
1998 deaths
Sportspeople from Palmerston North
New Zealand male field hockey players
Olympic field hockey players of New Zealand
Field hockey players at the 1956 Summer Olympics
20th-century New Zealand people